The National Convention for Construction and Reform – Mageuzi, popularly known by its acronym NCCR–Mageuzi, is an opposition political party in Tanzania.

History
The party was registered on 21 March 1993.

Electoral history

Presidential elections

Bunge elections

References

External links
NCCR-Mageuzi Blog

1993 establishments in Tanzania
Political parties established in 1993
Political parties in Tanzania
Social democratic parties in Africa